The  or Lake Geneva General Navigation Company (commonly abbreviated to CGN) is a public Swiss company operating ships on Lake Geneva connecting towns in both France and Switzerland including Geneva, and .

History
The CGN was formed in 1873 through the merger between three companies, bringing together the vessels 'Helvétie', 'Léman', 'Aigle' and later the 'Flèche' in a single fleet. The growth of tourism corresponded with the construction of railways during the second half of the 19th century, leading the CGN to cater for tourists as well as local traffic.
 
The cessation of tourism during World War I severely affected the CGN. Similarly affected during World War II, the company had to cease all operations for three months during 1940. The company was rescued by state intervention in 1943.

After the war the fleet was updated, with some steamships converted to diesel and from the 1960s augmented with new vessels.

Current fleet 

As a Swiss registered company, the ships fly the Swiss flag at the stern but, as the southern shore of the lake is mainly French territory, they also fly the Tricolour from the jackstaff at the bow.

References

External links 

 

Shipping companies of Switzerland
Paddle steamers
Companies based in Lausanne
Lake Geneva